Yangi Mirishkor is an urban-type settlement in Qashqadaryo Region, Uzbekistan. It is the administrative center of Mirishkor District. Its population was 3,107 people in 1989, and 17,000 in 2016.

References

Populated places in Qashqadaryo Region
Urban-type settlements in Uzbekistan